Dr Phay Seng Whatt (died 2009) was the Chairman of Public Service Commission in Singapore from January 1962 to June 1975.

Born in Malaysia, Dr Phay studied at Victoria School and Raffles Institution.

Dr Phay distinguished himself in the fair selection, judgement of people and the potential of civil servants at all levels of civil service, especially in the early years of Singapore's statehood.  

He died on 21 April 2009.

References

External links 
Tribute to Dr Phay Seng Whatt

Singaporean people of Chinese descent
20th-century Singaporean physicians
Singaporean civil servants
Victoria School, Singapore alumni
Raffles Institution alumni
National University of Singapore alumni
2009 deaths
Year of birth missing